Odiya Silweya (born 1 January 1959) is a Malawian sprinter. He competed in the men's 100 metres at the 1984 Summer Olympics.

References

1959 births
Living people
Athletes (track and field) at the 1984 Summer Olympics
Athletes (track and field) at the 1988 Summer Olympics
Malawian male sprinters
Olympic athletes of Malawi
Athletes (track and field) at the 1982 Commonwealth Games
Athletes (track and field) at the 1986 Commonwealth Games
Commonwealth Games competitors for Malawi
Place of birth missing (living people)